Brutti di notte (literally "Ugly by night") is a 1968 Italian comedy film written and directed  by Giovanni Grimaldi and starring the comic duo Franco and Ciccio. It is a parody of Luis Buñuel's film Belle de Jour.

Plot
Tormented by strange dreams, Franco decides to be examined by a psychoanalyst and, accompanied by Ciccio, his brother-in-law, goes to doctor Federzotti. Having established the cause of the complex that afflicts him, the psychoanalyst prescribes an intense love life as a cure. One day Ciccio discovers him in the company of a lady and immediately warns his wife Rosaspina. The woman, however, having understood that she is the cause of Franco's problems, due to the thick beard that frames her face, decides to get a facial plastic. Completely transformed, she makes an appointment with her husband undercover. Ciccio surprises them and, not knowing the truth, threatens to have Franco kicked out of the house. Rosaspina then reveals her true identity, bringing peace and harmony back into the family.

Cast 
  
 Franco Franchi as  himself
 Ciccio Ingrassia as  Rosapina's brother
 Gabriella Giorgelli as  Rosapina
 Fulvia Franco as Miss Ananas	
 Helga Liné as  Ursula
 Antonella Steni as Mazzacurati	
 Alfredo Rizzo as  Dr. Federzotti
 Ignazio Leone as  Giulio

References

External links

1960s parody films
Italian parody films
Films directed by Giovanni Grimaldi
1968 comedy films
1968 films
Films scored by Roberto Pregadio
1960s Italian films
1960s Italian-language films